Falling or fallin' may refer to:

Falling (physics), movement due to gravity
Falling (accident)
Falling (execution)
Falling (sensation)

People
Christine Falling (born 1963), American serial killer who murdered six children

Books
Falling (Provoost novel), a 1994 novel by Anne Provoost
Falling (Howard novel), a 1999 novel by Elizabeth Jane Howard
"Falling", a  1967 poem by James Dickey

Film and television
Falling (2008 film), a film by Richard Dutcher
Falling (2015 film), starring Adesua Etomi and Blossom Chukwujekwu
Falling (2020 film), an American-British-Canadian drama film
The Falling (1987 film), an American film by Deran Sarafian
The Falling (2014 film), a British film by Carol Morley
Falling (Dutch: Vallen), a 2001 film by Hans Herbots based on the novel by Anne Provoost 
Falling, a 2005 ITV adaptation of the novel by Elizabeth Jane Howard
"Falling", an episode of the television series Off the Air
"Falling" (Supergirl), an episode of the CBS television series Supergirl

Music

Albums
Falling (Blue Peter album), 1983
Falling (Praga Khan album), 2001
Fallin (album), 2012

Songs

Falling
"Falling" (Alesso song), 2017
"Falling" (Alison Moyet song), 1993
"Falling" (Ant & Dec song), 1997
"Falling" (Boom! song), 2001
"Falling" (Bruce Guthro song), 1998
"Falling" (Candice Alley song), 2003
"Falling" (Cathy Dennis song), 1993
"Falling" (Crooked Colours song), 2020
"Falling" (Gravity Kills song), 1998
"Falling" (Haim song), 2013
"Falling" (Harry Styles song), 2019
"Falling" (Julee Cruise song), 1990
"Falling" (LeBlanc and Carr song), 1977
"Falling" (Melba Moore song), 1986
"Falling" (Montell Jordan song), 1996
"Falling" (Trent Harmon song), 2016
"Falling" (Trevor Daniel song), 2018
"Falling", by Anette Olzon from Shine, 2013
"Falling", by Brooke Hogan, 2009
"Falling", by Gotthard from Domino Effect, 2007
"Falling", by Julian Marsh featuring Abigail, 2003
"Falling", by Lacuna Coil from Lacuna Coil, 1998
"Falling", by Lauren Jauregui from Prelude, 2021
"Falling", by Little River Band from The Net, 1983
"Falling", by Lyra (singer), 2019
"Falling", by Mike Posner from 31 Minutes to Takeoff, 2010
"Falling", by Roy Orbison, 1963
"Falling", by Staind from Chapter V, 2005

Fallin'
"Fallin'" (Alicia Keys song), 2001
"Fallin'" (Connie Francis song), 1958
"Fallin'" (Demy song), 2012
"Fallin'" (Jessica Mauboy song), 2017
"Fallin'" (Teenage Fanclub and De La Soul song), 1993
"Fallin'" (Why Don't We song), 2020
"Fallin'", from the musical They're Playing Our Song, 1978, covered by Sarah Geronimo

Other
Falling (game), a card game created by James Ernest

See also

Fall (disambiguation)
 Fallin (disambiguation)